The Red Bull Cape Fear is a surfing competition held at a local Sydney, Australian, break called Cape Fear, on the southern side of Botany Bay at Cape Solander. Known locally as 'Ours', it became the site of a Red Bull big wave surfing competition in August 2014 called Red Bull Cape Fear. Richie Vaculik competed against fellow local Evan Faulks. and Mark Mathews (surfer) and fellow professional surfer Ryan Hipwood organised the Red Bull Cape Fear event in August 2014.
Dion Thomson eventually took out the event.

Round 1

Round 2

Round 3

Round 4

Round 5

Quarter finals

Semi finals

Dion Thomson (winner)

See also

Surfing in Australia

References

External links

2014 in surfing
2015 in surfing
Red Bull sports events
Big wave surfing
2014 in Australian sport
2015 in Australian sport
Sports competitions in Sydney
Surfing competitions in Australia